Sheepskin is the hide of a sheep, sometimes also called lambskin or lambswool.

Sheepskin may also refer to:

 Parchment, a thin material made from calfskin, sheepskin or goatskin
 Diploma, originally made of sheepskin 
Lambskin condom, condoms made from sheep intestines